Emma Slevin (born 2 May 2003) is an Irish artistic gymnast.  She represented Ireland at the 2018 Youth Olympic Games.  She was the first Irish female gymnast to qualify for a senior all-around final at the European Championships and at the World Championships, doing both in 2021.

Career

Early life
Emma Slevin was born on 
2 May 2003 in Galway, Ireland.

Junior

2016–17
Slevin competed at the 2016 Irish Championships where she placed first in the Espoir division.  Additionally she placed first on balance beam, third on floor exercise, and sixth on uneven bars.  At the following year's competition she competed in the junior division and placed second behind Meg Ryan.  Slevin made her international debut at the 2017 Flanders International Team Challenge in Ghent where she placed 24th in the all-around and helped Ireland place seventh as a team.  Slevin concluded the season competing at the European Youth Olympic Festival where she finished 47th during qualifications.

2018
Slevin competed at the English Championships and finished first in the junior guest division.  At the Irish Championships Slevin finished first in the junior division.  In June Slevin competed at the Youth Olympic Qualifier and finished 16th, thus qualifying a spot for Ireland for the 2018 Summer Youth Olympics.  At the Irish Super Championships Slevin finished second on uneven bars and first on floor exercise. She competed at the European Championships but did not qualify for any event finals.

Slevin was selected to represent Ireland at the 2018 Youth Olympics, becoming the first Irish female gymnast to do so.  Additionally she was selected as the Irish flag bearer for the opening ceremonies.

At the Youth Olympic Games in Buenos Aires Slevin qualified to the all-around, vault, uneven bars, and balance beam finals.  In the all-around final she placed sixth.  During event finals she placed eighth on both vault and uneven bars and fifth on balance beam.

Senior

2019 
Slevin turned senior in 2019.  She competed at both the European Championships and the European Games but did not qualify for any event finals.  In October she competed at the World Championships and placed 96th in the all-around during qualifications.

2021 
In April Slevin competed at the European Championships.  During qualifications she placed 27th in the all-around and qualified to the final.  In doing so Slevin made history by becoming the first Irish female gymnast to qualify for a senior all-around final at any European Artistic Gymnastics Championships. She finished 19th.

In October Slevin competed at the World Championships.  She placed 21st during qualifications and qualified to the all-around final.  She became the first Irish female gymnast to qualify for a senior all-around final at the World Championships.

Competitive history

References

External links 

 

2003 births
Living people
Irish female artistic gymnasts
Gymnasts at the 2018 Summer Youth Olympics
Sportspeople from Galway (city)
Gymnasts at the 2019 European Games
European Games competitors for Ireland